Ornithogalum is a genus  of perennial plants mostly native to southern Europe and southern Africa belonging to the family Asparagaceae. Some species are native to other areas such as the Caucasus. Growing from a bulb, species have linear basal leaves and a slender stalk, up to 30 cm tall, bearing clusters of typically white star-shaped flowers, often striped with green. The common name of the genus, star-of-Bethlehem, is based on its star-shaped flowers, after the Star of Bethlehem that appears in the biblical account of the birth of Jesus. The number of species has varied considerably, depending on authority, from 50 to 300.

Description 
Ornithogalum species are perennial bulbous geophytes with basal leaves. Sensu lato, the genus has the characteristics of the tribe Ornithogaleae as a whole, since the tribe is monotypic in that sense. Sensu stricto, the genus is characterised by long linear to oblong-lanceolate (lance-shaped) leaves, sometimes with a white longitudinal band on the adaxial (upper) side, an inflorescence that is corymbose or pseudocorymbose, tepals that are white with a longitudinal green band only visible on the abaxial (lower) side, a capsule that is obovate or oblong, and truncate with six noticeable ribs in section and seeds that are globose with a prominently reticulate (net-like pattern) testa. The bulbs are ovoid with free or concrescent scales.

The longitudinal band on the leaves is thought to be caused by an interruption of palisade tissue in the central portion of the leaf. This is an apomorphy that was not present in the early lineage of this clade, but is also seen in some Albuca species.

Taxonomy 
Ornithogalum was originally described by Linnaeus in 1753, with 12 species, which he placed in the Hexandria Monogynia (six stamens, one carpel). When Michel Adanson formed the family Liliaceae in 1763, he placed Ornithogalum there, where it largely remained till this very large family was dismembered towards the end of the 20th century. Specifically, he included the genus with the onions (now Allioideae).

By the 1870s, as Baker describes in his revision of the family, the taxonomy of Liliaceae had become vast and complicated. Baker placed Ornithogalum in the tribe Scilleae, one of eight tribes into which he divided the Liliaceae. He then further subdivided the genus into seven subgenera. Of those, the first, Heliocharmos, corresponds to the modern Ornithogalum sensu stricto, with 23 species.

Later, in the United Kingdom, Bentham and Hooker published their volume on the Liliaceae in Latin in 1883. They divided the family into 20 tribes and placed Ornithogalum in the tribe Scilleae with 19 other genera, and indicated 70 species existed. In the German literature the taxonomic system of Engler completed its classification of the Liliaceae in 1888. He divided the family into 12 subfamilies and subordinate tribes. Ornithogalum was then placed in the subfamily Lilioideae and tribe Scilleae together with 21 other genera. The 70 species of Ornithogalum were then further divided into six sections, with section Heliocharmos corresponding to Baker's subgenus.

Ornithogalum is one of four genera in the tribe Ornithogaleae, the largest tribe within the subfamily Scilloideae of the Asparagaceae. Historically, it was treated as part of the subfamily Ornithogaloideae of Hyacinthaceae, now obsolete terms. The preferred treatment is to consider the Hyacinthaceae as subfamily Scilloideae of the Asparagaceae. The original subfamilies within Hyacinthaceae became tribes of subfamily Scilloideae. Thus subfamily Ornithogaloideae became tribe Ornithogaleae.

The precise taxonomy of the Ornithogaloideae/Ornithogaleae has been problematic since at least the time of Linnaeus. The Ornithogaloideae were one of four major clades within the Hyacinthaceae. Phylogenetic analysis subsumed all of that subfamily into the genus Ornithogalum with about 300 species. This sensu lato reduction of Speta's 14 genera into one was not widely accepted, though they were polyphyletic, and had a number of problems. (This also had the effect of eliminating Galtonia as a genus, under which a number of Ornithogalum species are still sold.)

Further analysis with wider sampling (70 compared to 40 taxa) and a third plastid region (matK) revealed the presence of three clades (A, B and C) within Ornithogaleae/Ornithogalum. Consequently, a new classification was proposed with three tribes and four genera, Ornithogalum corresponding to clade C, placed in tribe Ornithogaleae, but further subdivided into subgenera and sections, with 160 species. Galtonia was retained as a taxon, but at the subgenus level. An alternative approach was suggested by combining plastid gene sequences with nuclear DNA sequences, morphology, and biogeography. This supported Manning's clade C within which Ornithogalum was contained, but the very large subgenus Ornithogalum was noted to still be heterogeneous, which they had managed by treating it as seven sections. This study suggested reversing the sensu lato (lumping) approach of Manning et al., reverting to separate genera (splitting), thus resurrecting Galtonia.

The sensu stricto classification of  reduces the number of species to 50 as originally proposed by Speta.

Subdivision 
This very large genus has long been divided into many subgenera. The Flora Europaea (1980) lists 15 subgenera, many of which had at various times been separate distinct genera. Having originally subsumed all of the Ornithogaleae genera into the single genus Ornithogalum,  later subdivided this now very large genus into four subgenera after resurrecting three of the original subsumed genera (Albuca, Pseudogaltonia, Dipcadi). As proposed by them the genus has the following structure:
subgenus Avonsera (Speta) J.C.Manning & Goldblatt (monotypic: Ornithogalum convallarioides)
subgenus Galtonia (Decne.) J.C.Manning & Goldblatt (7 species)
subgenus Aspasia (Salisb.) Oberm. (30 species)
subgenus Ornithogalum (7 sections, 120 species)

Species 

Of the roughly 180 species, the best known are O. umbellatum, O. saundersiae, O. arabicum, and O. thyrsoides.
 
Ornithogalum arabicum (Star-of-Bethlehem)
Ornithogalum dubium (Sun star, yellow chincherinchee)
Ornithogalum maculatum (Snake flower)
Ornithogalum narbonense (Pyramidal star-of-Bethlehem)
Ornithogalum nutans (Drooping star-of-Bethlehem)
Ornithogalum pyrenaicum (Bath asparagus/Prussian asparagus/spiked star-of-Bethlehem)
Ornithogalum saundersiae (Giant chincherinchee)
Ornithogalum thyrsoides (Chincherinchee)
Ornithogalum umbellatum (Common star-of-Bethlehem) Type species
Ornithogalum xanthochlorum (Namaqua chink/slangkop)

Species formerly placed in Galtonia include:
Ornithogalum candicans (Baker) J.C.Manning & Goldblatt (Summer hyacinth, Cape hyacinth)
Ornithogalum princeps (Baker) J.C.Manning & Goldblatt
Ornithogalum regalis (Hilliard & B.L.Burtt) J.C.Manning & Goldblatt
Ornithogalum saundersiae Baker
Ornithogalum viridiflorum (I.Verd.) J.C.Manning & Goldblatt

Etymology 

The Latin genus name ornithogalum derives from Greek  ornithogalon referring to ornithogalum umbellatum, itself deriving from  ornis "bird" (GEN  ornithos) and  gala "milk". The name is thought to be related to the white colour of the flowers; in some species, they resemble bird droppings. The possible (non-attested) alternative form in ancient Greek  ornithogalē  seems to be the source of classical Latin ornithogale as used by Pliny the Elder.

Distribution and habitat 
When the genus is broadly circumscribed, as for example by Plants of the World Online, species are widely distributed over several continents including Africa (other than the tropics), Madagascar, Europe, and temperate Asia (as far as Afghanistan).

Uses 

Ornithogalum species may be sold as cut flowers, particularly O. arabicum, O. dubium,  O. saundersiae, and O.thyrsoides. They are also sold as ornamental garden flowers.

Toxicity and use in alternative medicine 
Some of the plants in the genus are poisonous, and have been known to kill grazing animals. Others are edible and used as vegetables. The bulbs contain alkaloids and cardenolides, which are toxic.

Ornithogalum has been listed as one of the 38 plants used to prepare Bach flower remedies, a kind of alternative medicine promoted for its effect on health. However, according to Cancer Research UK, "there is no scientific evidence to prove that flower remedies can control, cure or prevent any type of disease, including cancer".

Gallery

See also 
Taxonomy of Liliaceae

References

Bibliography

Historical sources

Databases 

 
 
 Distribution maps

External links

 
Asparagaceae genera
Taxa named by Carl Linnaeus